Abortion in Slovenia was legalized in its current form (in Slovenia and the other former Yugoslav republics) on October 7, 1977.

Abortion is available on-demand for women whose pregnancies have not exceeded the tenth week. Minors require parental consent before undergoing an abortion unless the minor is already emancipated and earning her own living. After Slovenia earned its independence from Yugoslavia, an amendment was made to the abortion law in 1992 allowing doctors to exempt themselves from performing abortions if they disagree with the practice for religious reasons.

Abortion is also included in Article 55 of Slovenia's Constitution.

Article 55 of the Slovenia's Constitution reads:

"(Freedom of Choice in Childbearing)"

(Everyone shall be free to decide whether to bear children.
The state shall guarantee the opportunities for exercising this freedom and shall create 
such conditions as will enable parents to decide to bear children.)

In 2009, 18% of pregnancies in Slovenia ended in abortion, down from a peak of 41.6% in 1982. , the abortion rate was 11.5 abortions per 1000 women aged 15–44 years. 

Mifepristone (medical abortion) was registered in 2013.

References

1977 establishments in Slovenia
Slovenia
Law of Slovenia